Corvera de Toranzo is a municipality located in the autonomous community of Cantabria, Spain. According to the 2007 census, the city has a population of 2,202 inhabitants. Its capital is San Vicente de Toranzo.

References

External links
Corvera de Toranzo - Cantabria 102 Municipios

Municipalities in Cantabria